Kostel is a village in northern Croatia. It is located just south of the D206 connecting Pregrada to Hum na Sutli. Two nearby villages, Kostelsko and Bregi Kostelski have the same name root.

References

Populated places in Krapina-Zagorje County